Microhabitat (lit. A Little Princess) is a 2017 South Korean drama film written and directed by Jeon Go-woon.

Plot
The plot is woven around the life of Miso, a thirty something year old woman who is willing to give up her basic necessities of life in order to protect what she treasures the most: cigarettes, whiskey and her boyfriend.

In 2015, Miso working as a housekeeper, finds her income barely enough to cover her expenses. When her landlord decides to increase the rent, she takes up more work to make ends meet. An increase in the price of cigarettes forces her to switch to a cheaper brand. Nonetheless, her calculations show her falling short of money by the end of the year. Pondering a bit over her main expenditures - rent, whiskey and cigarettes - she decides to do away with rent. She makes a list of her old band-mates, planning to stay with each of them for a while.

First one refuses to accommodate her citing her high-pressure job as the reason. The next, Hyeon Jeong was a keyboard player and warmly welcomes Miso into her marital home. Hyeon's husband objects privately, claiming the surprise guest would be an inconvenience for his parents and the couple argue loudly enough for Miso to hear. Among other things, Hyeon confesses to Miso her diffidence in cooking for her in-laws, who had run a restaurant for thirty years and her anger at having to do all of housework. In the morning, Miso cooks for her friend and leaves. She calls on a guitarist (Woo Moon Gi) next. His parents are visibly elated and conspicuously hint at marriage to their son. After an uncomfortable night, she leaves and goes to the house of a drummer, Dae Yong, whom she had affectionately considered a younger brother. Dae has a room to spare since his 8-month old marriage has just broken down. But Miso's boyfriend, who is staying at an all-male dormitory provided by his factory, expresses feelings of inadequacy at Miso having to stay with a male friend. Miso moves out, spending the night in a restaurant.

The next band-mate Miso visits is Choi Jeong-mi, who appears very well-off and has a large house. Recalling a previous instance when Miso had helped her out of debt, Choi Jeong-mi tells her she can stay as long as she wants. Free of having to pay rent at last, Miso builds up savings. In the meantime, her boyfriend reveals that he is fed up of his spartan life and that giving up his dreams of becoming a cartoonist, he has volunteered for an assignment in Saudi Arabia which would enable him to pay off his school debts in a couple of years. A conversation with Choi Jeong-mi's husband, where Miso refers to her wild past, annoys Choi Jeong-mi and Miso gets thrown out. Miso visits a number of apartments, each progressively worse, in search of a cheap place to stay but none appear within her means.

Cutting forward an unknown amount of time, all the band-mates except Miso are shown meeting up at a funeral, where they exchange perfunctory memories about Miso. A woman, with greying hair similar to Miso, is shown walking along and later in a portable tent pitched next to a highway.

Cast
 Esom as Miso 
 A former musician who now works as a housekeeper that decides to leave her accommodation due to the increase in rental costs.
 Ahn Jae-hong as Han-sol
 An aspiring online comic artist who hasn’t found much success, and also the boyfriend of Mi-so.
 Choi Deok-moon as Kim Rok-yi 
 Kim Jae-hwa as Choi Jeong-mi
 Kim Gook-hee as Jeong Hyeon-jeong 
 Lee Sung-wook as Dae-yong
 Kang Jin-ah as Choi Moon-yeong
 Cho Soo-hyang as Min-ji
 Kim Ye-eun as Jae-kyung

Production
Microhabitat is Jeon's feature debut. It was produced by independent production outlet Gwanghwamun Cinema, which Jeon founded in 2013.

Release and reception
During the first two weeks since its release, Microhabitat had attracted 46,000 moviegoers.

Screen Anarchy highlighted the lead performance of Esom and reviewed the film as "vibrant and fun, yet always thoughtful and often poignant".

The rights to the film have been sold to multiple Asian countries including, Cambodia, Indonesia, Laos, Malaysia, Myanmar, Nepal, the Philippines, Singapore, Sri Lanka, Thailand, Vietnam and China.

Awards and nominations

References

External links

Microhabitat at Naver Movies 

2017 films
South Korean drama films
CGV Arthouse films
2017 directorial debut films
2017 drama films
2010s South Korean films